Sun Xiaocun (November 11, 1906 – May 4, 1991) was a Chinese male politician, who was the vice chairperson of the Chinese People's Political Consultative Conference.

References 

1906 births
1991 deaths
Vice Chairpersons of the National Committee of the Chinese People's Political Consultative Conference